Mordellistena insulcata is a species of beetle in the genus Mordellistena of the family Mordellidae. It was described in 1929 by Maurice Pic.

References

insulcata
Beetles described in 1929